The John Sautter Farmhouse is a historic one-and-a-half-story farm house in Papillion, Nebraska. It was built in 1866 for John Sautter Sr., his wife Anna Elisabeth Lehner, and their three sons. The Sautters were immigrants from Ostdorf, Balingen, Württemberg, Germany. After John Sr. died in 1905 and his wife died in 1914, their son John Jr. lived on the farm until 1943. The house was acquired by the Papillion Area Historical Society in 1979 and relocated from North Papillion to its current location. It has been listed on the National Register of Historic Places since September 30, 1980.

References

Farms on the National Register of Historic Places in Nebraska
National Register of Historic Places in Sarpy County, Nebraska
Houses completed in 1866
1866 establishments in Nebraska Territory